Seth Bogart (born February 28, 1980) is an American multidisciplinary artist. As a musician, he is known for his solo career, as well as Hunx and His Punx and Gravy Train!!!!. As a visual artist, Bogart's paintings and sculptures have been exhibited in galleries throughout the United States, and he has created the World of Wonder web series Feelin' Fruity. He also runs the streetwear line Wacky Wacko.

Pitchfork named Bogart the "New King of Camp" in 2016.

Early life and career 
Bogart grew up in Tucson, Arizona, where his father was a lawyer and his mother was a nurse. In high school, he started playing the guitar and created the punk zine Puberty Strike. He later produced the zine Psycho No. 1 Fan.

When Bogart was 18, his father committed suicide. He moved to Oakland, California shortly thereafter. At 19, he studied cosmetology at Laney College, and later, in 2006, he co-founded the salon and vintage clothing store Down at Lulu's on Telegraph Avenue in Oakland.

Music 

As a teenager in the mid-1990s, Bogart created the record label Heroes for Today, which put out albums by indie bands and distributed zines. In the late 1990s, Bogart created the record label Super Eight Underground, which put out albums both by and featuring indie bands such as The Causey Way, Deep Lust, The Mooney Suzuki, The Rondelles, Scared of Chaka, and Skinned Teen. He closed the label in 2000.

Bogart joined Oakland-based electroclash band Gravy Train!!!! as a backup dancer under the name Hunx shortly after its inception in the early 2000s. He soon began writing songs for the band and performing as the band's singer and guitarist.

In 2008, he founded Hunx and His Punx, a garage punk band, which changed its lineup in 2010 and was renamed to Hunx and His Punkettes. After this lineup disbanded in 2011, Bogart sold Down at Lulu's.

In 2012, Bogart released a solo album as Hunx titled Hairdresser Blues, and, in 2015, Bogart came out with an eponymous solo album under his own name. 2020 saw the release of his "Boys Who Don't Wanna Be Boys" and a remix version of the same album.

Clothing 
Bogart relocated to Los Angeles in 2013, and, in 2014, he started streetwear label Wacky Wacko. Initially, it was to be a record label, until he lost interest in that idea. The line grew in popularity, and could be seen on Miley Cyrus, Tavi Gevinson, and Kathleen Hanna. From 2014–17, the label had a store on Sunset Boulevard in Echo Park. During this time, his work was imitated by fast fashion retailer Zara.

Bogart has also collaborated with fashion house Saint Laurent. Director Hedi Slimane was a fan of Bogart's work, and used his drawings in a Saint Laurent fabric pattern entitled "Hunx notebook," and a song by Hunx and His Punx in a promotional video.

Video 
In 2011, Bogart and collaborator Brande Bytheway launched a Kickstarter campaign to fund a TV show. Hollywood Nailz launched as a web series in November 2012, and was likened to a "bizarro '80s Public Access-style variety show".

In May 2018, World of Wonder launched the web series Feelin' Fruity, a variety show which starred Bogart, and was inspired by Disneyland's Toontown and Pee-wee's Playhouse. It featured such guests as Alice Bag, Kate Berlant, Tammie Brown, John Early, Cole Escola, Manila Luzon, and Allison Wolfe.

Bogart has also worked on music videos for other musicians. He directed Tegan and Sara's "U-Turn" (2016) and was the set designer for Trixie Mattel's "Yellow Cloud" (2019).

Sculpture and paintings 
Bogart began taking classes at ArtCenter College of Design in 2013, and began selling ceramic versions of familiar objects—including perfume bottles and grooming supplies—at the Wacky Wacko store shortly thereafter.

In 2014, Los Angeles art gallery 365 Mission included a painting by Bogart in a group show, and, in 2015, 365 Mission gave him a solo show, in which he transformed the gallery space into The Seth Bogart Show, an immersive experience that displayed sculpture, paintings, ceramics, and video, as well as served as a performance venue.

Nino Mier gave Bogart a show in their Los Angeles gallery in 2018. Entitled Lick, it transformed the space into a sex shop, and included paintings and ceramic pieces by Bogart.

In 2019, Chicago's Soccer Club Club gallery hosted 100 Toothbrushes, a solo exhibit of 100 ceramic toothbrushes by Bogart.

In 2020 and 2021, he crafted ceramic sculptures of books with significance in the LGBTQ+ community. These works were exhibited at New York City's Fierman Gallery and Jeffrey Deitch Gallery, and received international press.

Personal life 
Bogart is openly gay. He came out to his friends while in high school, and to his mother when he was eighteen. In the early 2010s, Bogart dated fellow musician Daniel Pitout of Nü Sensae, the suspected true identity of country star Orville Peck.

Discography

As Hunx and His Punx

Studio albums 
 Too Young to Be in Love (2011)
 Street Punk (2013)

Compilations 
 Gay Singles (2010)

As Hunx

Studio albums 
 Hairdresser Blues (2012)

As H.U.N.X.

Singles 
 I Vant to Suck (2012)

As Seth Bogart

Studio albums 
 Seth Bogart (2016)
 Men on the Verge of Nothing (2020)

Singles 
 "Eating Makeup" (2015) featuring Kathleen Hanna
 "Club with Me" (2016)
 "Boys Who Don't Wanna Be Boys" (2020)
 "Boys Who Don't Wanna Be Boys – The Remixes" (2020)

As S.L.I.N.K.

Singles 
 "Pink Christmas" (2014)

Published works

Zines 
  (c. 1996–98)
  (undated; after Puberty Strike)

Books

Exhibitions

Solo 
 2015 – The Seth Bogart Show, 356 Mission, Los Angeles
 2018 – LICK, Nino Mier Gallery, Los Angeles
 2019 – 100 Toothbrushes, Soccer Club Club, Chicago
 2021 – Library Fantasy Volume 1, Fierman Gallery, New York City

Group 
 2010 – Total Trash, A440 Gallery, San Francisco
 2014 – Another Cats Show, 356 Mission, Los Angeles
 2014 – You're My Playground Love, KK Gallery, Los Angeles
 2014 – Perfume Mania Installation, The Geffen Contemporary at MOCA, Los Angeles
 2016 – Volatile! A Poetry and Scent Exhibition, Poetry Foundation, Chicago
 2016 – THINGS: A Queer Legacy of Graphic Art & Play, ONE Archives, Los Angeles
 2016 – THINGS: A Queer Legacy of Graphic Art & Play, Participant Inc., New York City
 2017 – Last, Artist Curated Projects, Los Angeles
 2018 – Tom House, Mike Kelley Mobile Homestead, Museum of Contemporary Art Detroit, Detroit
 2019 – Circus of Books, Fierman Gallery, New York City
 2020 – Heaven and Hell, Tom of Finland Foundation, Los Angeles
 2020 – Circus of Books: Blowout, Fierman Gallery, New York City
 2021 – Clay Pop, Jeffrey Deitch, New York City

Curator 
 2021 – Wild Frontiers, The Pit, Los Angeles

References

External links 
 
 

1980 births
American video artists
Artists from Arizona
Hardly Art artists
American LGBT singers
Living people
Painters from Arizona
People from Tucson, Arizona
Sculptors from Arizona
LGBT people from Arizona
American punk rock musicians
Queercore musicians
American indie rock musicians
American contemporary painters